Mrakovo (Moraq) is a rural locality (a selo) and the administrative center of Kugarchinsky District in the Republic of Bashkortostan, Russia, located on the Bolshoy Ik River. Population:

References

Notes

Sources

Rural localities in Kugarchinsky District